Boucardicus fortistriatus is a species of land snail with an operculum, a terrestrial gastropod mollusk in the family Cyclophoridae.

This species is endemic to Madagascar where its natural habitat is subtropical or tropical dry forests. It lives in the Toliara Province of Madagascar, and is found only above 860 m ASL on Mount Vasiha.

Conservation status
B. fortistriatus was assessed as critically endangered in 2000. The status was assessed by K. C. Emberton, one of the species' authorities, and evaluated by M. B. Seddon of the Mollusc Red List Authority. The species was found to meet three of the 'critically endangered' species criteria - B1, that the existing population is "severely fragmented or known to exist at only a single location", and B2cd, that a continuing decline is projected in the species' "area, extent and/or quality of habitat" and "number of locations or subpopulations". B. fortistriatus is furthermore estimated to occupy less than 10 km2. This species' habitat within Madagascar is being destroyed by slash and burn agriculture, according to the IUCN.

References

Boucardicus
Molluscs of Madagascar
Gastropods described in 1999
Taxonomy articles created by Polbot
Endemic fauna of Madagascar